Athletes from Trinidad and Tobago competed at the 1980 Summer Olympics in Moscow, USSR.

Results by event
Men's 100 metres
Christopher Brathwaite
 Heat – 10.44
 Quarterfinals – 10.37
 Semifinals – 10.54 (did not advance)

Hasely Crawford
 Heat – 10.42
 Quarterfinals – 10.28 (did not advance)

Men's 4x400 metres Relay
 Joseph Coombs, Charles Joseph, Rafer Mohammed, and Mike Solomon
 Heat – 3:04.3
 Final – 3:06.6 (6th place)

References
Official Olympic Reports
International Olympic Committee results database

Nations at the 1980 Summer Olympics
1980
Summer Olympics